was the owner of the A. Farsari & Co. photographic studio, based in Yokohama, Japan. Tonokura, who had known the firm's founder Adolfo Farsari since the 1870s, managed the firm's day-to-day affairs until he became its owner in 1901. He left the company in 1904 to start his own studio.

References
Dobson, Sebastian. "Yokohama Shashin". In Art & Artifice: Japanese Photographs of the Meiji Era – Selections from the Jean S. and Frederic A. Sharf Collection at the Museum of Fine Arts, Boston (Boston: MFA Publications, 2004), 28.

Japanese photographers
19th-century births
Year of death missing